Sandhanwal is a village in Shahkot in Jalandhar district of Punjab State, India. The village is administrated by Sarpanch an elected representative of the village. Sandhawal is resident of Famous Gurjeet Singh Gill.

Demography 
, The village has a total number of 580 houses and the population of 2,776 of which 1957 are males while 673 are females.  As of 2021 , out of the total population of the village 77 people are from Schedule Caste and the village does not have any Schedule Tribe population so far.

See also
List of villages in India

References

External links 
 Tourism of Punjab
 Census of Punjab

Villages in Jalandhar district